Giannino Bianco (24 October 1944 – 26 November 2016) was an Italian racing cyclist. He rode in the 1969 Tour de France.

References

1944 births
2016 deaths
Italian male cyclists
Place of birth missing